CFR Title 43 - Public Lands: Interior is one of fifty titles comprising the United States Code of Federal Regulations (CFR). Title 43 is the principal set of rules and regulations  issued by federal agencies of the United States regarding public lands under the jurisdiction of the Department of the Interior. It is available in digital and printed form, and can be referenced online using the Electronic Code of Federal Regulations (e-CFR).

Structure 

The table of contents, as reflected in the e-CFR updated February 19, 2014, is as follows:

 43